Death Seed may refer to:
in the Star Wars universe, the
Death Seed starfighter
The Death Seed plague